The Lhotshampa or Lhotsampa people are a heterogeneous Bhutanese people of Nepalese descent. "Lhotshampa", which means "southern borderlanders" in Dzongkha, began to be used by the Bhutanese state in the second half of the twentieth century to refer to the population of Nepali origin in the south of the country. After being displaced as a result of the state-run ethnic cleansing and living in refugee camps in eastern parts of Nepal, starting in 2007, most of the Lhotshampas, or Bhutanese Refugees, were resettled to various countries, such as the United States, Canada, Australia, the United Kingdom, and other European countries.  the number of Lhotshampa in Nepal is significantly lower than that in the United States and other countries where they have resettled. People of Nepalese origin started to settle in uninhabited areas of southern Bhutan in the 19th century.

History 
The first small groups of Nepalese emigrated primarily from eastern Nepal under British auspices in the late nineteenth and early twentieth centuries. The beginning of Nepalese immigration largely coincided with Bhutan's political development: in 1885, Druk Gyalpo Ugyen Wangchuck consolidated power after a period of civil unrest and cultivated closer ties with the British in India. In 1910, the government of Bhutan signed a treaty with the British in India, granting them control over Bhutan's foreign relations. The actual immigrants registered and settled through the agent from Kalimpong, Raja Ugen Dorji and (son) Raja Sonam Togbay Dorji started in the reigns of the second and third kings. Immigrants from Nepal and India continued to enter Bhutan with an increase from the 1960s when Bhutan's first modern five-year plan began, many arriving as construction workers.

The government traditionally attempted to limit immigration and restrict residence and employment of Nepalese to the southern region. Liberalization measures in the 1970s and 1980s encouraged intermarriage and provided increasing opportunities for public service. The government allowed more internal migration by Nepalese seeking better education and business opportunities. However, the most divisive issue in Bhutan in the 1980s and early 1990s was the accommodation of the Nepalese Hindu minority.

In 1988, the government census branded many ethnic Nepalis as illegal immigrants. Local Lhotshampa leaders responded with anti-government rallies demanding citizenship and attacks against government institutions.

In 1989, the Bhutanese government enacted reforms that directly impacted the Lhotshampa. First, it elevated the status of the national dress code of the Driglam namzha from recommended to mandatory. All citizens including the Lhotshampa were required to observe the dress code in public during business hours. This decree was resented by the Lhotshampa who complained about being forced to wear the clothing of the Ngalong majority. Second, the government removed Nepali as a language of instruction in schools in favor of Dzongkha, the national language. This alienated the Lhotshampa, many of whom knew no Dzongkha at all.

Expulsion 

Since the late 1980s, over 100,000 Lhotshampa have been forced out of Bhutan, accused by the government of being illegal aliens. Between 1988 and 1993, thousands of others left alleging ethnic and political repression. In 1990, violent ethnic unrest and anti-government protests in southern Bhutan pressed for greater democracy and respect for minority rights. That year, the Bhutan Peoples' Party, whose members are mostly Lhotshampa, began a campaign of violence against the Bhutanese government. In the wake of this unrest, thousands fled Bhutan. Many of them have either entered Nepal's seven refugee camps (on 20 January 2010, 85,544 refugees resided in the camps) or are working in India. According to U.S. State Department estimates in 2008, about 35% of the population of Bhutan is Lhotshampa.

Culture 
Traditionally, the Lhotshampa have been involved mostly in sedentary agriculture, although some have cleared forest cover and conducted tsheri and slash and burn agriculture. The Lhotshampa are generally classified as Hindus. However, this is an oversimplification as many groups that include Tamang and the Gurung are largely Buddhist; the Kiranti groups that include the Rai and Limbu are largely animist followers of Mundhum (these latter groups are mainly found in eastern Bhutan). Whether they are Hindu or Tibetan Buddhist, most of them abstain from beef, notably those belonging to the orthodox classes who are vegetarians. Their main festivals include Dashain and Tihar.

Language 

Lhotshampas speak Nepali as their first language. Samchi, Chirang and Geylegphug are southern dzongkhags that have a large Lhotshampa community where most people speak Nepali. In southern Bhutan, Nepali used to be taught in the school and was spoken and written in these areas. However, this changed during the 1980s when there was racial conflict between Nepali in Bhutan and Bhutanese. Since then, Nepali is only taught in the home and has become a spoken language in Bhutan. Thus, some Nepali speakers from southern Bhutan cannot read or write in Nepali. Currently, Nepali is the first language for most southern Bhutanese and most people use it in their home. Also, Nepali is most commonly used in school outside of the classes.

Nepali in Bhutan is different in the rural areas and Thimphu. Also, some Nepali words are used differently in Bhutan than Nepali in Nepal.

Vocabulary differences

Nepali words in Bhutan and Nepal

Notable Lhotsampas 
 Tek Nath Rizal, Bhutanese politician
 Indra Adhikari, journalist
 Mangala Sharma, human and women's rights activist
 Hiranyamayee Lama, politician
 Loknath Sharma, politician
 Jai Bir Rai, politician
 Dilliram Sharma Acharya, Bhutanese poet in Nepali language
 Biren Basnet, footballer
 Khare Basnet, footballer
 Hemlal Bhattrai, footballer
 Mon Bhattrai, footballer
 Dhan Bahadur Biswa, footballer
 Dinesh Chhetri, footballer
 Hari Gurung, footballer
 Karun Gurung, footballer
 Man Bahadur Gurung, footballer
 Puspalal Sharma, footballer
 Diwash Subba, footballer
 Anju Gurung, women's cricketer

See also 
 Ethnic cleansing in Bhutan  
 Tek Nath Rizal
 Goldhap Refugee Camp
 Beldangi refugee camps
 Immigration in Bhutan
 Demographics of Bhutan
 Ethnic groups in Bhutan

Notes

References

External links 
 Bhutanese Refugees – A story of a forgotten people
 The Bhutanese refugees
 The Bhutanese Refugees – Human Rights Watch
 UNHCR briefing – Bhutanese Refugees
 New wave from Bhutan settles in - Burlington (Vermont) Free Press

Indo-Aryan peoples